Henry De Butts was an officer in the United States Army who served as acting Adjutant General and acting Inspector General of the U.S. Army from 1792 to 1793.

De Butts entered the Army from Maryland as a lieutenant in the levies of 1791. He was wounded in the Battle of the Wabash while serving under General Arthur St. Clair in November, 1791. He was appointed to act as Adjutant General in March 1792, when Winthrop Sargent declined appointment to the office.  He was promoted to Captain in December, 1792 and relieved as Adjutant General in February, 1793.  He served as aide-de-camp to General Anthony Wayne in the Battle of Fallen Timbers in August, 1794.  He was assigned to the 4th Infantry in November, 1796, and resigned December 31, 1797.

Henry De Butts was the younger brother of General Sir Augustus De Butts KCH.

See also
List of Adjutant Generals of the U.S. Army
List of Inspectors General of the U.S. Army

References

Year of birth missing
Year of death missing
Adjutants general of the United States Army
American people of the Northwest Indian War
Inspectors General of the United States Army
People from Maryland